Each team in the 2014 Indonesian Inter Island Cup named a minimum of 18 players in their squads (three of whom were goalkeepers) by the deadline that Liga Indonesia determined was on 7 January 2014. Injury replacements were allowed until 24 hours before the team's first match.

Group A

Sriwijaya
Manager:  Subangkit

Arema Cronous
Manager:  Suharno

Barito Putera
Manager:  Salahudin

Perseru Serui
Manager:  Robby Maruanaya

Group B

Persib Bandung
Manager:  Djajang Nurdjaman

Persik Kediri
Manager:  Aris Budi Sulistyo (caretaker)

Persiram Raja Ampat
Manager:  Gomes de Olivera

Mitra Kukar
Manager:  Stefan Hansson

References

squads